St Ive and Pensilva, formerly St Ive is a civil parish in Cornwall, England, United Kingdom. The parish has 4,246 residents and an area of 6,894 acres.

The parish is centred on the village of St Ive and also contains Gang, Middlehill, Parkfield, Pensilva, St Ive Cross and Woolston.

History 
The parish was renamed from "St Ive" to "St Ive and Pensilva" on 1 April 2021.

References

External links

Civil parishes in Cornwall
Bodmin Moor